The second season of Bachelor in Paradise Australia premiered on 9 April 2019.

The series concluded on 2 May 2019 with a reunion episode.

Contestants
Strahan and Nation were revealed on 10 March 2019. An extra 13 contestants were announced on 14 March 2019, which results in 15 cast members being announced, with more intruders to be revealed later. On 7 April 2019, Favios and  Krslovic were announced as contestants by Network 10, resulting in 17 cast members. In Episode 2 on 10 April 2019, Obrochta arrived on the show and Bourne & Lloyd were announced at the end of the episode. O'Brien was announced in advertisements by Network 10 before the episode in which she intruded in, while Moerenhout was leaked before the season began & confirmed by Network 10 in an announcement on 17 April 2019. Murger was announced at the end of episode 10, the episode before she appeared.

Elimination table

Colour Key
 The contestant is male.
 The contestant is female.
 The contestant went on a date and gave out a rose at the rose ceremony.
 The contestant went on a date and received a rose at the rose ceremony.
 The contestant gave or received a rose at the rose ceremony, thus remaining in the competition.
 The contestant received the last rose.
 The contestant went on a date and received the last rose.
 The contestant returned and received a rose at the rose ceremony.
 The contestant went on a date and was eliminated.
 The contestant was eliminated. 
 The contestant had a date and voluntarily left the show.
 The contestant voluntarily left the show.
 The couple left the show together but later split.
 The couple broke up and were eliminated.
 The couple decided to stay together, but split after Bachelor in Paradise Australia ended.
 The couple decided to stay together and won the competition.

Episodes

Notes

Ratings

References

External links 
 

2019 Australian television seasons
Australian (season 02)